We Got a Good Thing Going is the thirteenth album led by the saxophonist Hank Crawford and his second release on the Kudu label.

Reception

AllMusic awarded the album 4 stars stating, "Of Hank Crawford's somewhat erratic output for Kudu during 1971-78, this is the album to get. The Don Sebesky arrangements for strings and an oversized rhythm section fit Crawford's soulful style well and the altoist performs consistently strong material that was also commercially successful".

Track listing
 "We Got a Good Thing Going" (The Corporation) - 6:00
 "I Don't Know" (Bill Withers) - 4:20
 "Down to Earth" (Ron Miller, Avery Vandenberg) - 3:25
 "I'm Just a Lucky So-and-So" (Duke Ellington, Mack David) - 6:55 	
 "Imagination" (Jimmy Van Heusen, Johnny Burke) - 3:15 	
 "Little Tear" (Don Sebesky) - 3:33 
 "The Christmas Song" (Mel Tormé, Robert Wells) - 3:38
 "Winter Wonderland" (Felix Bernard, Richard B. Smith) - 3:35 
 "Alone Again (Naturally)" (Gilbert O'Sullivan) - 3:30 	
 "Dirt Dobbler" (Alfred Ellis) - 3:32
 "Betcha by Golly, Wow" (Thom Bell, Linda Creed) - 5:10
 "This Is All I Ask" (Gordon Jenkins) - 3:41
 "Jazz Bridge" (Sebesky) - 2:50

Personnel 
Hank Crawford - alto saxophone
Richard Tee - piano, electric piano, organ
George Benson, Cornell Dupree - electric guitar
Ron Carter, Gordon Edwards - double bass, electric bass
Bernard Purdie - drums 
Phil Kraus - vibraphone, orchestra bells
Art Jenkins - congas, tambourine
Max Ellen, Paul Gershman, Emanuel Green, Harold Kohon, Harry Lookofsky, Joe Malin, David Nadien, Elliot Rosoff, Irving Spice - violin
Al Brown, Harold Coletta, Ted Israel - viola
Charles McCracken, George Ricci - cello
Margaret Ross - harp
Bob James, Don Sebesky - arranger, conductor

References 

1972 albums
Hank Crawford albums
Kudu Records albums
Albums produced by Creed Taylor
Albums arranged by Don Sebesky
Albums recorded at Van Gelder Studio